Oyede is a town in the Isoko North Local Government Area in Delta State, Nigeria.

Populated places in Delta State